Johann Friedrich Weidler (13 April 1691 in Großneuhausen – 13 November 1755 in Wittenberg) was a German astronomer and mathematician.

Biography
He was a professor of mathematics at University of Wittenberg and a fellow of the Royal Society.
In 1727 he moved to Basel, returning in 1746 to teach again at the University of Wittenberg

His Historia Astronomiae sive de Ortu et Progressu Astronomiae. Liber Singularis, published in Wittenberg in 1741, was the first, complete history of astronomy, also appreciated by Lalande. He also wrote texts on mathematics and hydraulics.

References

Works

External links

1691 births
1755 deaths
18th-century German mathematicians
18th-century German astronomers
Fellows of the Royal Society